Scelioninae is a subfamily of wasps in the family Platygastridae. It is a very large cosmopolitan group (over 3000 described species in some 160 genera) of exclusively parasitoid wasps, mostly small (0.5–10 mm), often black, often highly sculptured, usually with geniculate (elbowed) antennae that have a 9- or 10-segmented flagellum. It was formerly considered to be a family Scelionidae but has been reclassified as a subfamily of the Platygastridae.

The subfamilies Scelioninae, Teleasinae, and Telenominae were formerly in the family Scelionidae, but Scelionidae was combined with the family Platygastridae because of genetic similarities. The name Platygastridae was retained for the resulting family because of seniority. This change is not accepted by all authorities: Telenominae is a subfamily of Scelionidae according to the Australian Faunal Directory.

Biology
They are generally idiobionts, attacking the eggs of many different types of insects, spiders, butterflies (the hackberry emperor, for example) and many are important in biological control. Several genera are wingless, and a few attack aquatic insect eggs underwater.

See also
 List of Scelioninae genera

References

External links
Cedar Creek Pinned specimen images.
 Paper on the Genus Thoron.

 
Biological pest control wasps
Parasitic wasps